The D&I Railroad (DAIR) (also nicknamed the Dakota and Iowa Railroad) is a Class III shortline railroad which is a wholly owned subsidiary of L. G. Everist, Inc. The line hauls ethanol, dried distillers grains (DDG), corn oil, plastic pellets, cement, sand, gravel, and Sioux Quartzite, which is mined from two large quarries in Dell Rapids.

The D&I has a trackage rights agreement with BNSF that allows it to travel on three BNSF subdivisions to deliver and sell products, as they must use BNSF’s system to reach their southern half of their trackage. The D&I operates on both former Chicago, Milwakuee, St. Paul and Pacific Railroad and Chicago and Northwestern Railroad trackage, which were handed over to the state of South Dakota in 1980-1981 after the Milwaukee Road’s bankruptcy and subsequent abandonment of unprofitable lines.

Name
The D&I is sometimes also referred to as the Dakota and Iowa Railroad or the Dale and Irene Railroad. However, the official name is only the D&I Railroad, with the Dakota and Iowa or Dale and Irene being only nicknames.

Trackage
The D&I operates from Dell Rapids, SD to Sioux City, IA via company-owned trackage and via trackage rights with BNSF Railway.

The D&I operates company-owned trackage from Dell Rapids to Sioux Falls, where it connects with the BNSF Madison Subdivision. Heading south via trackage rights on BNSF’s Madison Subdivision and Canton Subdivision, It connects to trackage from Canton, South Dakota to Elk Point, South Dakota that is owned by the State of South Dakota and operated by D&I. Along this trackage is a siding servicing a POET biorefinery near Hudson, SD that produces ethanol, DDG, and corn oil. Otherwise, D&I uses this trackage primarily to haul products down to Sioux City, Iowa via a connection with BNSF's Aberdeen Subdivision in Elk Point. Most of these products are loaded onto barges alongside the Missouri River (typically at or near Big Soo Terminal). At Sioux City, The D&I is able to connect to the BNSF Railway, the Canadian National Railway, and the Union Pacific Railroad due to a trackage agreement for BNSF's Aberdeen Subdivision.

The D&I also operates a former Chicago and Northwestern branch line from Hawarden, Iowa to Beresford, South Dakota, which is also owned by the State of South Dakota.

Roster
:
 Gondola cars (170)
 Control Flow Ballast cars (60+)
 Pneumatic Open-Top Hopper cars (390+)
 Locomotives (18)

References

External links
 Official Website
 BNSF Railway Website with D&I Details 
 Union Pacific Website with D&I Details

South Dakota railroads